WAY-213,613 is a drug which acts as a reuptake inhibitor for the glutamate transporter subtype EAAT2, selective over other glutamate transporter subtypes and highly selective over metabotropic and ionotropic glutamate receptors. It is used in scientific research into the function of the glutamate transporters.

References 

Amino acid derivatives
Excitatory amino acid reuptake inhibitors
Bromoarenes
Fluoroarenes